Innocent is a 1921 British silent drama film directed by Maurice Elvey and starring Madge Stuart, Basil Rathbone and Edward O'Neill. The film marked the screen debut of Rathbone, with his casting as a villainous figure pointing towards the sort of roles he would play in later British and Hollywood films. The film was made by Stoll Pictures, Britain's leading film company of the era, at Cricklewood Studios.

Synopsis
A naive country girl comes to the city, where she is seduced by a cynical artist.

Cast
 Madge Stuart as Innocence  
 Basil Rathbone as Amadis de Jocelyn 
 Lawrence Anderson as Robin  
 Edward O'Neill as Hugo de Jocelyn  
 Frank Dane as Ned Langdon  
 W. Cronin Wilson as Armitage  
 Ruth Mackay as Lady Maude  
 Mme. d'Esterre as Miss Leigh 
 Annie Esmond as Housekeeper

References

Bibliography
 Kabatchnik, Amnon. Sherlock Holmes on the Stage: A Chronological Encyclopedia of Plays Featuring the Great Detective. Scarecrow Press, 2008.
 Low, Rachael. The History of the British Film 1918-1929. George Allen & Unwin, 1971.

External links
 

1921 films
1921 drama films
British drama films
British silent feature films
1920s English-language films
Films directed by Maurice Elvey
Films based on British novels
Films based on works by Marie Corelli
Films shot at Cricklewood Studios
British black-and-white films
1920s British films
Silent drama films